Alexandre Varenne (3 October 1870 in Clermont-Ferrand – 16 February 1947 in Paris) was a French politician and journalist, best remembered as the founder of the newspaper La Montagne. He was the Governor-General of French Indochina from 1925 to 1928.

References 

1870 births
1947 deaths
French politicians
French journalists
French expatriates in Vietnam